Dakaniya Talav railway station is a railway station in Kota district, Rajasthan. Its code is DKNT. It serves Kota Industrial Area. The station consists of 2 platforms. Passenger, Express, and Superfast trains halt here.

References

Railway stations in Kota district
Kota railway division